Groton may refer to:

Places

England
Groton, Suffolk
Groton Wood

United States
Groton, Connecticut, a town
Groton (city), Connecticut, within the town
Groton, Massachusetts, a town
Groton (CDP), Massachusetts, the main village in the town
Groton, New Hampshire
Groton Wind Power Project
Groton (town), New York
Groton (village), New York, within the town
Groton, South Dakota
Groton, Vermont, a town
Groton (CDP), Vermont, within the town

Boarding schools in the United States
Groton School
Lawrence Academy at Groton

Other
 Groton Bridge Company, a former American firm
 Groton High School (disambiguation)

See also
 Croton (disambiguation)

simple:Groton